Alejandro Mejía (born March 10, 1993) is a Dominican professional baseball first baseman and third baseman for the Pericos de Puebla of the Mexican League. He previously played for the Hiroshima Toyo Carp of Nippon Professional Baseball (NPB).

Career

St. Louis Cardinals
On May 28, 2011, Mejía signed with the St. Louis Cardinals organization as an international free agent. He spent the 2011 and 2012 seasons with the DSL Cardinals, slashing .172 in 2011 and .217 in 2012 before being released.

Hiroshima Toyo Carp
After spending three years out of baseball, Mejía signed with the Hiroshima Toyo Carp of Nippon Professional Baseball. On July 20, 2017, the Carp signed Mejía to a six-year contract. He appeared in 9 games in 2017, notching 3 hits in 14 at-bats. In 2018, he played in 22 games, slashing .268/.318/.537 with 3 home runs and 7 RBI. In 2019, he posted a batting line of .259/.306/.426 with 7 home runs and 17 RBI in 56 games. Mejía hit .188/.235/.288 with 2 home runs and 4 RBI in 37 games for the Carp in 2020. He became a free agent following the 2021 season.

Pericos de Puebla
On March 18, 2022, Mejía signed with the Pericos de Puebla of the Mexican League.

References

External links

NPB player page

1993 births
Living people
Dominican Summer League Cardinals players
Dominican Republic expatriate baseball players in Japan
Dominican Republic expatriate baseball players in Mexico
Dominican Republic national baseball team players
Hiroshima Toyo Carp players
Nippon Professional Baseball first basemen
Nippon Professional Baseball third basemen
Pericos de Puebla players
Sportspeople from Santo Domingo
Toros del Este players
2019 WBSC Premier12 players